Wilhelm 'Willi' Sturm (8 February 1940 – 5 November 1996) was a German football player. He spent 8 seasons in the Bundesliga with Borussia Dortmund. He represented Germany once, in a friendly against Finland.

Honours
 UEFA Cup Winners' Cup winner: 1966.
 Bundesliga runner-up: 1966.
 DFB-Pokal winner: 1965.
 DFB-Pokal finalist: 1963.

External links
 

1940 births
1996 deaths
German footballers
Germany international footballers
Bundesliga players
Borussia Dortmund players
Sportspeople from Bochum
Association football midfielders
Footballers from North Rhine-Westphalia
West German footballers